The Eretz Israel Museum (also known as Muza) is a historical and archeological museum in the Ramat Aviv neighborhood of Tel Aviv, Israel.

Eretz Israel Museum, established in 1953, has a large display of archaeological, anthropological and historical artifacts organized in a series of exhibition pavilions on its grounds. Each pavilion is dedicated to a different subject: glassware, ceramics, coins, copper and more. The museum also has a planetarium.

The "Man and His Work" wing features live demonstrations of ancient methods of weaving, jewelry and pottery making, grain grinding and bread baking. Tel Qasile, an excavation in which 12 distinct layers of culture have been uncovered, is on the grounds of the museum.

Archaeology

Ancient copper production
The Nechushtan pavilion is dedicated to the copper production at Timna in the southern Negev during the Chalcolithic, Bronze and Iron Age periods. The pavilion contains a reconstructed mine, smelting furnaces, and findings from the Egyptian-Midianite mining temple at Timna.

The reconstructed Chalcolithic and Late Bronze Age mine displays mining tools such as stone hammers, flint blades and copper chisels, as well as the typical marks they left on the rock.

Four smelting furnaces are on display:
 Bowl furnace from the Chalcolithic period (4th millennium BCE)
 Domed furnace of the Late Bronze Age (14th–13th centuries BCE)
 Authentic Late Bronze Age furnace (12th century BCE)
 Shaft furnace of the Iron Age (10th century BCE).

Midianite temple pavilion
In the 14th century BCE, the Egyptian pharaohs dispatched mining expeditions to Timna. Alongside expert metalsmiths from the Land of Midian, they extracted copper at Timna until the early 12th century BCE. This pavilion houses a Midianite temple model. Of special interest is the copper snake with gilded head found in the Midianite shrine, reminding of the biblical Nehushtan, "the bronze serpent that Moses had made".

Glass pavilion
This pavilion exhibits ancient glass vessels. The exhibition is divided into three sections, representing three eras in the history of glass production: pre-blown glass (Late Bronze Age to Hellenistic period—15th-1st centuries BCE), blown glass of the Roman and Byzantine periods (1st–7th centuries CE), and blown glass of the Islamic period (7th–15th centuries CE). Two rare vessels on display are a delicate drinking horn with two openings, known by its Greek name "rhyton", and "Ennion's Blue Jug" bearing the signature of its famous maker, who lived in the first half of the 1st century CE.

Remnants of a glass furnace from the 13th century CE were discovered alongside the Crusader castle at Sommelaria, north of Acre.

On loan from the Israel Antiquities Authority (IAA) is a unique Byzantine (late 6th – early 7th century) gold-glass panel from the "Birds Mosaic Mansion" in Caesarea.

Ethnography and folklore
The ethnography and folklore section contains Judaica produced either by the Jewish diaspora in different periods, or in the Land of Israel between 1880 and 1967.

Numismatics
The Kadman Numismatic section displays means of payment used in the country, starting those used before to the development of coinage, and going through all historical periods until today.

Postal history and philately

The Alexander Museum of Postal History and Philately recounts the history of postal service in the Land of Israel from the mid-15th century until the founding of the state in 1948. On display are envelopes, letters, photographs,  posters, mailboxes and telephones, as well as a mail truck from 1949.

The philatelic wing displays valuable and rare stamps.

See also
List of museums in Israel

References

External links

Official site
 http://alexandercollection.org/

Archaeological museums in Israel
History museums in Israel
Living museums
Museums established in 1953
Museums in Tel Aviv
Museums of Ancient Near East in Israel
Philatelic museums
1953 establishments in Israel